Edwin Gabriel Ríos (born April 21, 1994) is a Puerto Rican professional baseball third baseman and first baseman for the Chicago Cubs of Major League Baseball (MLB). He has also played in MLB for the Los Angeles Dodgers. He played college baseball for Florida International University. Ríos was drafted by the Dodgers in the sixth round of the 2015 Major League Baseball draft and made his MLB debut in 2019.

Early life
Ríos was born in Caguas, Puerto Rico. His parents are Heyda Rosario and Edwin Rios. Early in life, his family moved to Kissimmee, Florida, where he played baseball at Osceola High School.

Career

Amateur
Ríos played college baseball at Florida International University, for whom in his junior year in 2015 he batted .314/.421/.592 (second in Conference USA) with 18 home runs (leading the conference) and 56 RBIs (2nd) in 223 at bats. In 2013 he played collegiate summer baseball with the Cotuit Kettleers of the Cape Cod Baseball League. He then returned to the league in 2014 to play for the Orleans Firebirds. Ríos was drafted by the Dodgers in the sixth round of the 2015 Major League Baseball draft.

Professional

Los Angeles Dodgers

Ríos began his professional career with the Arizona League Dodgers in 2015 but was quickly promoted to the Ogden Raptors of the Pioneer Baseball League. He hit .253/.317/.467 with three home runs and 13 RBIs in 22 games for the two teams. 

He began 2016 with the Great Lakes Loons of the Midwest League, hitting .252 with six homers and 13 RBI in 33 games, earning a promotion to the Rancho Cucamonga Quakes of the California League, where he hit .367/.394/.712 with 16 homers and 46 RBIs in 177 at-bats over 42 games. He was promoted again, to the Tulsa Drillers of the Texas League. He was named the Dodgers organizational minor league player of the year for 2016. 

Ríos was named as a starter in the Texas League mid-season All-Star Game in 2017. For the season, he played in 128 games between Tulsa and AAA Oklahoma City and hit .309/.362/.533 with 24 homers and 91 RBIs in 393 at-bats. He was named a Baseball America Double-A All-Star, and an MiLB.com Dodgers Organization All-Star.

The Dodgers added him to their 40-man roster after the 2018 season. He returned to Oklahoma City to begin 2019, and batted .270/.340/.575 with 31 home runs and 91 RBIs in 393 at-bats. He was named an MiLB.com Dodgers Organization All-Star.

He was promoted to the majors for the first time on June 27, 2019. He made his debut that night as a pinch hitter against the Colorado Rockies and grounded out to first base. His first major league hit was a triple off of Jon Gray of the Rockies on June 29. On August 14, Ríos hit his first two major league home runs off of Elieser Hernández of the Miami Marlins. 

He appeared in 28 games for the Dodgers in 2019, hitting .277/.393/.617 with four home runs and eight RBIs in 47 at-bats. He played 12 games at first base, three at third base, one in left field, and one at DH.

Ríos hit the first-ever two-run home run by a batter leading off an inning in MLB history on July 29, 2020. The home run came in the top of the 13th inning in a game against the Houston Astros and ended up being the deciding factor in the game. 

During the pandemic-shortened 2020 season, Ríos appeared in 32 games for the Dodgers, batting .250/.301/.645 with eight home runs and 17 RBIs in 76 at-bats. He played 21 games at third base, six at first base, and one at DH. He was hitless in three at-bats with a walk in his one start in the National League Wild Card Series against the Milwaukee Brewers. He suffered a groin injury prior to the second round of the playoffs and was left off the roster. He rejoined the Dodgers roster for the 2020 NLCS, where he hit two home runs in nine at-bats against the Atlanta Braves. Ríos only had two at-bats in the 2020 World Series, both of which were strikeouts.

In 2021, Ríos played in 25 games and had four hits in 51 at-bats with one home run. However, his season ended on May 11, when the Dodgers announced that he would undergo season-ending surgery on a partially torn labrum in his right shoulder.

Ríos began the 2022 season on the major league roster, appearing in 27 games and hitting .244 with seven homers and 17 RBIs. He suffered a hamstring strain on June 3 and spent the next two and a half months on the injured list. When he finally returned in mid-August there was no longer a spot on the major league club and he spent the rest of the season with Oklahoma City. In the minors, he played in 48 games and hit .259 with nine homers and 39 RBIs.

On November 18, 2022, Ríos was non-tendered by the Dodgers and became a free agent.

Chicago Cubs
Ríos signed a one year, $1 million, Major League contract with the Chicago Cubs on February 17, 2023.

References

External links

1994 births
Living people
Major League Baseball players from Puerto Rico
People from Caguas, Puerto Rico
Major League Baseball first basemen
Los Angeles Dodgers players
FIU Panthers baseball players
Orleans Firebirds players
Cotuit Kettleers players
Arizona League Dodgers players
Ogden Raptors players
Great Lakes Loons players
Rancho Cucamonga Quakes players
Tulsa Drillers players
Oklahoma City Dodgers players